Praveen Thapur (born 9 September 1972) is an Indian former cricketer. He played one first-class match for Delhi in 1994/95.

See also
 List of Delhi cricketers

References

External links
 

1972 births
Living people
Indian cricketers
Delhi cricketers
People from Faridabad
Cricketers from Haryana